Ashish Nehra (born 29 April 1979) is a cricket coach and former cricketer who played in all formats of the game. Nehra announced his retirement from all forms of cricket in late 2017, with the Twenty20 International match against New Zealand on 1 November 2017 at Feroz Shah Kotla Ground his last appearance.

Early and personal life
Nehra was born in 1979 in Sadar Bazaar, Delhi Cantonment, Delhi to Diwan Singh Nehra and Sumitra Nehra in a Hindu Jat family.

International career

On the 26th of February 2003, during the 2003 ICC Cricket World Cup, Nehra took a 6-wicket haul, conceding 23 runs against England, which is till date, the best bowling figures by an Indian bowler in Cricket World Cup history. 

Nehra was named in the 'Team of the Tournament' for the 2016 T20 World Cup by the ICC and Cricinfo.

In the 2013–14 Ranji Trophy, he took 6/16 from 10 overs to bowl out Vidarbha for a meagre 88 in the first innings at the Roshanara Club Ground at Delhi.

After recovering from the ankle injury that prevented him from playing for the Delhi Ranji Team in the 2007–08 season, Nehra joined the Indian Premier League and signed up for the Mumbai Indians franchise. For his performances in 2014 and 2015 for Chennai Super Kings, he was named in the Cricinfo CLT20 XI.

Coaching career 
In January 2018, Royal Challengers Bangalore appointed Ashish Nehra as their bowling coach. Nehra retained his position in 2019's season of IPL.

In January 2022, he was appointed the head coach of newly formed Indian Premier League franchise Gujarat Titans. In the 2022 IPL season, Gujarat Titans finished top of the table and went on to win the trophy in the final against Rajasthan Royals. Nehra also became the first Indian head coach to win the Indian Premier League.

References

External links

 
 
 

1979 births
Living people
ACC Asian XI One Day International cricketers
India Test cricketers
India One Day International cricketers
India Twenty20 International cricketers
Indian cricketers
Cricketers at the 2003 Cricket World Cup
Cricketers at the 2011 Cricket World Cup
Mumbai Indians cricketers
Delhi Capitals cricketers
Pune Warriors India cricketers
Delhi cricketers
North Zone cricketers
India Green cricketers
Cricketers from Delhi
Chennai Super Kings cricketers
Indian cricket coaches